The Boulder Fire was a wildfire that burned in California Valley in San Luis Obispo County, California in the United States. The fire started on June 5, 2019 and burned . It was 100% contained by the evening of June 5.

Fire

The Boulder Fire was reported at 10:49 AM on Boulder Creek Trail in California Valley, California on June 5, 2019. The fire, fueled by grass, had grown to  acres by the time it was reported. Within a half an hour, 40 percent of it had been contained and one building and a solar array were under threat. The fire's smoke, which was very dark, was visible in eastern San Luis Obispo. Air tankers were assigned to fight the fire later in the day. The fire was contained by the evening of June 5.

References

External links
 

2019 California wildfires
June 2019 events in the United States
Wildfires in San Luis Obispo County, California